Goria may refer to:

 Goria (surname), list of people with the surname
 Goriya, ethnic group of India
 Goria, Bhopal, village in India
 Goria festival of Tripura, India
 Goria dance of Tripura, India
 Lac de Goria, lake in Corsica, France